Cut the Rope is a series of physics-based puzzle video games developed by entertainment company ZeptoLab for several platforms and devices. It consists of the original game of the same name (2010) published by Chillingo, Cut the Rope: Holiday Gift (2010), Cut the Rope: Experiments (2011), Cut the Rope: Time Travel (2013), Cut the Rope 2 (2013 iOS; 2014 Android), My Om Nom (2014 iOS; 2015 Android), Cut the Rope: Magic (2015), and Cut the Rope Remastered (2021).

The objective of the Cut the Rope games is to feed candy to a little green creature named Om Nom while collecting stars. As of May 2015, Cut the Rope games have been downloaded more than 600 million times and had surpassed over a billion downloads by 2018.

Games

Cut the Rope (2010)

Cut the Rope, the first game in the series, was released initially on February 28, 2010. A native (HD) version for the iPad was released on October 6, 2010. This was followed by the release of a free version with fewer levels for each device, called Cut the Rope Free and Cut the Rope HD Free respectively.

Cut the Rope: Experiments (2011)
Cut the Rope: Experiments was released on August 4, 2011, as a sequel to Cut the Rope. While its gameplay and presentation closely match that of Cut the Rope, the sequel introduces new gameplay elements as well as a new storyline and characters. The Professor, for example, “provides running commentary” throughout the game as players unlock new levels and collect "hidden" photos that reveal more information about Om Nom's character.

Cut the Rope: Time Travel (2013)

The third sequel, Cut the Rope: Time Travel, was released on April 17, 2013. It sees Om Nom travel back to the time of his ancestors, which means in terms of gameplay that players now feed candy to two monsters rather than to only one.

Cut the Rope 2 – Unexpected Adventure (2013 iOS, 2014 Android)
Cut the Rope 2 was released on 19 December 2013 for iOS devices. It expands on the previous games with Om Nom no longer being a static stage object, additional monster characters and a more dynamic environment. The Android version was released on March 28, 2014, on Google Play and on April 3 on Amazon AppStore. Unlike the iOS version, Cut the Rope 2 for Android adds free-to-play elements such as an energy system, and features a map like structure instead of level packs; these features would eventually be added to the iOS version of the game.

Cut the Rope: Triple Treat (2014)
Cut the Rope: Triple Treat was released on March 25, 2014, for Nintendo 3DS, including levels from the three previous Cut the Rope games, Cut the Rope, Cut the Rope: Experiments and Cut the Rope: Time Travel. The 3DS version is published by Activision.

My Om Nom (2014 iOS, 2015 Android)
My Om Nom was released on December 18, 2014, for iOS devices and 2015 for Android devices. In this game, the player has their own Om Nom to feed, dress up, and play with. It includes some simple games to play with Om Nom, and it is reminiscent of the Tamagotchi franchise and similar to Pou.

Cut the Rope: Magic (2015)
Cut the Rope: Magic was released on December 17, 2015, for both iOS and Android devices. This game sees Om Nom being transported to a storybook world where the levels involve magical elements as well as battling an equally candy-loving spider wizard. Magic added a new transformation element to Om Nom, allowing him to shrink or turn into a completely different animal. The game also uses a map element seen in the Android version and later versions of the iOS version of Cut the Rope 2. While the iOS version was exclusively paid, the Android version is free-to-play, and thus, added an energy system that could be removed with a one-time micropayment, which was later replaced with a paid subscription. A free version was eventually added to iOS, but did not carry the energy system from the Android release.

Om Nom: Merge (2019)
Om Nom: Merge was released on November 28, 2019, and is the first video game entry in the franchise in four years, due to the success of Om Nom Stories.

Om Nom: Run (2020)
Om Nom: Run is a free-to-play endless runner mobile game, released on February 27, 2020. It is available on Android, iOS platforms and the Nintendo Switch. The game follows Om Nom running through the dangerous streets of Nomville. The game starts by tapping the touchscreen, while Om Nom (the game's starter character) or any other character exits the base, and then starts running through the streets of Nomville.

The game has multiple gameplay modes. The main mode, called Free Run, is a traditional endless runner game. The mission mode gives players tasks to complete as they run. This mode ends when the player crashes or completes the mission objectives.

The initial release has been a success. In a span of one month, it has been downloaded for over 5 million times.

Cut the Rope Remastered (2021) 
A remastered version of Cut the Rope was released on April 2, 2021, on Apple Arcade. In the game, Om Nom and his family celebrate his birthday; on this special occasion, Nibble Nom takes out a few books as birthday presents, which are based on the events on the previous games in the series. In the game, there are five level packs, this time presented as books, with levels either taken from or are based on five of the previous entries: Evan's House, based on the original, Experiments and Time Travel, both based on the games of the same name, Road Trip, based on Cut the Rope 2 and Magic (based on the game of the same name). New to the series are levels containing Nibble Nom instead of Om Nom; the player has to guide three candies to the creature instead of one, and Nibble Nom himself can be pushed about and interact with other objects, while Om Nom remains stationary in levels until Road Trip. Another new feature is bonus levels containing Om Nelle; the player has to give her the candy with the box filled with water. Remastered also features new 3D graphics, an interactive map where power-ups (magnets, candy rain and teleporter) and "worldstars", which are added to certain levels for replay value, can be found, and an account system, where up to six saves can be used.

Level packs
All games in Cut the Rope series (except for Cut the Rope 2 for Android and Cut the Rope: Magic) group content into "boxes" or "level packs". Boxes in the original Cut the Rope and Cut the Rope: Experiments contain 25 levels each, boxes in Cut the Rope 2 and Cut the Rope Remastered contain 24 levels each, and boxes in Cut the Rope: Time Travel contains only 15 levels each (except for the last box, Parallel Universe, which has 20). Most boxes introduce a new element in the game, challenging the player with a new set of game mechanics. New boxes continue to be added from time to time through updates. Three stars can be collected in every level, while an extra star, known as the power star as of Remastered, can be found in each level when using superpowers. In Remastered, a special magenta worldstar can be found for some levels by interacting with items on the world map.

The following table summarizes the number of packs and levels in each traditional Cut the Rope game, as of May 2021.

Cut the Rope level packs
 Cardboard Box.
 Fabric Box.
 Foil Box.
 Magic Box. Magic Box was first released on April 5, 2011.
 Valentine Box was first released on February 14, 2011.
 Toy Box. Toy Box was first released in July 2011.
 Gift Box.
 Cosmic Box. Cosmic Box was released on December 16, 2010.
 Toolbox. Toolbox was first released in October 2011
 Buzz Box. Buzz Box was first released on December 20, 2011.
 DJ Box. DJ Box was first released on April 25, 2012.
 Spooky Box. Spooky Box was first released on August 23, 2012.
 Steam Box. Steam Box was first released on January 10, 2013.
 Lantern Box. Lantern Box was first released in February 2013.
 Cheese Box. Cheese Box was first released on July 26, 2013.
 Pillow Box. Pillow Box was first released on June 11, 2014 for Android - June 17, 2014 for iOS.
 Mechanical Box. Mechanical Box was first released on March 25, 2015 for iOS - March 26, 2015 for Android.

Cut the Rope: Experiments level packs 

 Getting Started.
 Shooting the Candy.
 Sticky Steps.
 Rocket Science. Rocket Science was released in November 2011.
 Bath Time. Bath Time was released in February 2012.
 Handy Candy. Handy Candy was released in May 2012.
 Ant Hill. Ant Hill was released in March 2013.
 Bamboo Chutes. Bamboo Chutes was released in December 2013 for Android - February 2014 for iOS.

Cut the Rope: Time Travel level packs 

 The Middle Ages.
 The Renaissance.
 Pirate Ship. 
 Ancient Egypt.
 Ancient Greece
 The Stone Age
 Disco Era. Disco Era was released in August 2013. 
 Wild West. Wild West was released on December 11, 2013 for iOS - January 16, 2014 for Android along with The Future.
 Asian Dynasty. Asian Dynasty was released on April 3, 2014. 
 Industrial Age. Industrial Age was released on October 23, 2014 for Android - October 30, 2014 for iOS. 
 The Future. The Future was released on December 11, 2013 for iOS - January 16, 2014 for Android along with Wild West.
 Parallel Universe. Parallel Universe was released in April 2016.

Cut the Rope 2 level packs 

 Forest.
 Sandy Dam.
 Junkyard.
 City Park.
 Underground.
 Fruit Market. Fruit Market was released in June 2014.
 Bakery. Bakery was released in December 2014.

Cut the Rope Magic level packs 

 Sky Castle.
 Mushroom Land.
 Magic Forest.
 Mystery Cave.
 Ancient Library.
 Stone Temple. Stone Temple was released on February 18, 2016.
 Tree Village.
 Snowy Hills. Snowy Hills was released in December 2016.

Cut the Rope Remastered level packs 

 Evan's Home.
 Experiments.
 Time Travel.
 Road Trip.
 Magic. Magic was released on May 12, 2021.

Reception
In addition to its commercial success, Cut the Rope was very well received by critics. It has a score of 93 on Metacritic, indicating "universal acclaim".

Cut the Rope: Experiments reached an aggregate Metacritic score of 85 out of 100, Cut the Rope: Time Travel — a score of 84, and Cut the Rope 2 a score of 81.

Adaptations, spin-offs and merchandise
Om Nom Stories, an animated web series on ZeptoLab's YouTube channel and sold to several kid-oriented streaming sites, is based on the game series and revolves around Om Nom's life out of the game.

In July 2011, ZeptoLab and comics publisher Ape Entertainment published a comic book series to be published as a stand-alone app. The comics tell the backstory of the candy-eating monster Om Nom and introduce new characters.

The character Om Nom has become the subject of a viral video, plush toys, and a Mattel Apptivity game.

In August 2014, ZeptoLab and McDonald's Europe announced a multi-market Happy Meal promotional campaign, which featured various Cut the Rope-themed kitchen accessories, such as banana splitter and juicer. "Hungry for fruit and fun?" was the key message of the campaign. As part of the promotion, ZeptoLab also released the game called Cut the Rope: Hungry for Fruit.

In June 2015, ZeptoLab partnered with Blockade Entertainment for a feature film based on the games, titled Om Nom: The Movie, that was set for release in 2016, but it never came to fruition.

In March 2021, Zeptolab created a personalized book for children in collaboration with LionStory. The book features Om Nom, Om Nelle, Toss, Snail Brow, Roto, Lick, Ginger, Blue and a personalized character of a child (appearance, name, dedication and a back cover photo).

See also
 List of most downloaded Android applications

References

External links
 Official website (English)

Puzzle video games
IOS games
MacOS games
Casual games
Browser games
DSiWare games
Symbian games
Windows games
Firefox OS games
Windows Phone games
BlackBerry 10 games
Nintendo 3DS eShop games
BlackBerry PlayBook games
Android (operating system) games
Russian inventions
Apple Design Awards recipients
Video game franchises
Video games adapted into television shows
Video games scored by Alberto Jose González
Video games developed in Russia
Video game franchises introduced in 2010